If We Believe Lopotukhin... is a 1983 Soviet science fiction-comedy film directed by Mikhail Kozakov.

Plot
Vasya Lopotukhin who comes late for the mathematics exam says that he met with a representative of extraterrestrial civilization, or, more simply, a humanoid who flew on a ZAZ Zaporozhets without wheels and is very similar to the school headmaster, only he also wore a helmet. Vasya is forced to renounce his stories about the stranger at the general school meeting, but whether to believe him or not, each of the participants in this story decides for himself.

Cast
Grisha Evseev — Vasya Lopotukhin
Leonid Bronevoy — Yuri Leonidovich, school director / humanoid
Svetlana Kryuchkova — Alla Konstantinovna, teacher of mathematics
Boryslav Brondukov — Uncle Kolya
Vitaly Leonov (Stepan Ivanovich) and Ivan Ufimtsev (Ivan Stepanovich) — Friends of Uncle Kolya
Vasya Arkanov — Shafirov
Natasha Zbrueva — Malakhova
Anton Narkevich — Pavlov
Maxim Kondratiev — Petrov
Maksim Shirokov — Polukektov

References

External links

Studio Ekran films
Soviet science fiction comedy films
1980s science fiction comedy films
1980s high school films
Soviet television films
1983 comedy films
1983 films